Verbascum nigrum, the black mullein or dark mullein, is a species of biennial or short-lived perennial herbaceous plant in the mullein genus Verbascum, native to dry open sites in temperate Europe.

Verbascum nigrum forms clumps of leaves from which arise multiple tall stems of yellow flowers with purple stamens, blooming over a long period in summer and early autumn. It is cultivated as an ornamental plant, and prefers a calcareous or neutral soil in full sun.

Fossil record
A tentative seed identification of V. nigrum has been made from substage II of the Hoxnian interglacial at Clacton in Essex, UK.

References

nigrum
Flora of Europe
Plants described in 1753
Taxa named by Carl Linnaeus